Magadha was a region and one of the sixteen  of the Second Urbanization (600–200 BCE) in what is now south Bihar (before expansion) at the eastern Ganges Plain. Magadha was ruled by Brihadratha dynasty,  Pradyota dynasty (682–544 BCE), Haryanka dynasty (544–413 BCE),  the Shaishunaga dynasty (413–345 BCE) and the Mauryan dynasty by the end of it. Villages had their own assemblies under their local chiefs called Gramakas. Their administrations were divided into executive, judicial, and military functions.

Magadha played an important role in the development of Jainism and Buddhism. It was succeeded by four of northern India's greatest empires, the Nanda Empire (c. 345–322 BCE), Maurya Empire (c. 322–185 BCE), Shunga Empire (c. 185–78 BCE) and Gupta Empire (c. 319–550 CE). The Pala Empire also ruled over Magadha and maintained a royal camp in Pataliputra.

The Pithipatis of Bodh Gaya referred to themselves as Magadhādipati and ruled in parts of Magadha until the 13th century.

Geography

The territory of the Magadha kingdom proper before its expansion was bounded to the north, west, and east respectively by the Gaṅgā, Son, and Campā rivers, and the eastern spurs of the Vindhya mountains formed its southern border. The territory of the initial Magadha kingdom thus corresponded to the modern-day Patna and Gaya districts of the Indian state of Bihar.

The region of Greater Magadha also included neighbouring regions in the eastern Gangetic plains and had a distinct culture and belief. Much of the Second Urbanisation took place here from (c. 500 BCE) onwards and it was here that Jainism and Buddhism arose.

History

Some scholars have identified the Kīkaṭa tribe—mentioned in the Rigveda (3.53.14) with their ruler Pramaganda—as the forefathers of Magadhas because Kikata is used as synonym for Magadha in the later texts; Like the Magadhas in the Atharvaveda, the Rigveda speaks of the Kikatas as a hostile tribe, living on the borders of Brahmanical India, who did not perform Vedic rituals.

The earliest reference to the Magadha people occurs in the Atharvaveda, where they are found listed along with the Angas, Gandharis and Mujavats. The core of the kingdom was the area of Bihar south of the Ganges; its first capital was Rajagriha (modern day Rajgir), then Pataliputra (modern Patna). Rajagriha was initially known as 'Girivrijja' and later came to be known as so during the reign of Ajatashatru. Magadha expanded to include most of Bihar and Bengal with the conquest of Vajjika League and Anga, respectively. The kingdom of Magadha eventually came to encompass Bihar, Jharkhand, Orissa, West Bengal, eastern Uttar Pradesh, and the areas that are today the nations of Bangladesh and Nepal.

The ancient kingdom of Magadha is heavily mentioned in Jain and Buddhist texts. It is also mentioned in the Ramayana, the Mahabharata and the Puranas.

There is little certain information available on the early rulers of Magadha. The most important sources are the Buddhist Pāli Canon, the Jain Agamas and the Hindu Puranas. Based on these sources, it appears that Magadha was ruled by the Haryanka dynasty for some 200 years, c. 543 to 413 BCE.

Gautama Buddha, the founder of Buddhism, lived much of his life in the kingdom of Magadha. He attained enlightenment in Bodh Gaya, gave his first sermon in Sarnath and the first Buddhist council was held in Rajgriha.

The Hindu Mahabharata calls Brihadratha the first ruler of Magadha. Ripunjaya, last king of Brihadratha dynasty, was killed by his minister Pulika, who established his son Pradyota as the new king. Pradyota dynasty was succeeded by Haryanka dynasty founded by Bimbisara. Bimbisara led an active and expansive policy, conquering the Kingdom of Anga in what is now West Bengal. King Bimbisara was killed by his son, Ajatashatru. Pasenadi, king of neighbouring Kosala and brother-in-law of Bimbisara, promptly reconquered the Kashi province.

Accounts differ slightly as to the cause of King Ajatashatru's war with the Licchavi, a powerful tribe north of the river Ganges. It appears that Ajatashatru sent a minister to the area who worked for three years to undermine the unity of the Licchavis. To launch his attack across the Ganges River, Ajatashatru built a fort at the town of Pataliputra. Torn by disagreements, the Licchavis fought with Ajatashatru. It took fifteen years for Ajatashatru to defeat them. Jain texts tell how Ajatashatru used two new weapons: a catapult, and a covered chariot with swinging mace that has been compared to a modern tank. Pataliputra began to grow as a centre of commerce and became the capital of Magadha after Ajatashatru's death.

The Haryanka dynasty was overthrown by the Shishunaga dynasty. The last Shishunaga ruler, Mahanandin, was assassinated by Mahapadma Nanda in 345 BCE, the first of the so-called "Nine Nandas", i. e. Mahapadma and his eight sons, last being Dhana Nanda.

In 326 BCE, the army of Alexander approached the western boundaries of Magadha. The army, exhausted and frightened at the prospect of facing another giant Indian army at the Ganges, mutinied at the Hyphasis (the modern Beas River) and refused to march further east. Alexander, after the meeting with his officer Coenus, was persuaded that it was better to return and turned south, conquering his way down the Indus to the Ocean.

Around 321 BCE, the Nanda Dynasty ended with the defeat of Dhana Nanda at the hands of Chandragupta Maurya who became the first king of the Mauryan Empire with the help of his mentor Chanakya. The Empire later extended over most of India under King Ashoka The Great, who was at first known as 'Ashoka the Cruel' but later became a disciple of Buddhism and became known as 'Dharma Ashoka'. Later, the Mauryan Empire ended, as did the Shunga and Khārabēḷa empires, to be replaced by the Gupta Empire. The capital of the Gupta Empire remained Pataliputra in Magadha.

During the Pala-period in Magadha from the 11th to 13th century CE, a local Buddhist dynasty known as the Pithipatis of Bodh Gaya ruled as tributaries to Pala Empire.

Buddhism and Jainism
Several Śramaṇic movements have existed before the 6th century BCE, and these influenced both the āstika and nāstika traditions of Indian philosophy. The Śramaṇa movement gave rise to diverse range of heterodox beliefs, ranging from accepting or denying the concept of soul, atomism, antinomian ethics, materialism, atheism, agnosticism, fatalism to free will, idealization of extreme asceticism to that of family life, strict ahimsa (non-violence) and vegetarianism to the permissibility of violence and meat-eating. Magadha kingdom was the nerve centre of this revolution.

Jainism was revived and re-established after Mahavira, the last and the 24th Tirthankara, who synthesised and revived the philosophies and promulgations of the ancient Śramaṇic traditions laid down by the first Jain tirthankara Rishabhanatha millions of years ago. Buddha founded Buddhism which received royal patronage in the kingdom.

According to Indologist Johannes Bronkhorst, the culture of Magadha was in fundamental ways different from the Vedic kingdoms of the Indo-Aryans. According to Bronkhorst, the śramana culture arose in "Greater Magadha," which was Indo-Aryan, but not Vedic. In this culture, Kshatriyas were placed higher than Brahmins, and it rejected Vedic authority and rituals. He argues for a cultural area termed "Greater Magadha", defined as roughly the geographical area in which the Buddha and Mahavira lived and taught. Suggestive of this distinction, in some Vedic and post-Vedic rituals, a "Magadha man" represents the canonical non-Vedic "Barbarian", the Magadhan standing in for the presence of any and all non-Vedic peoples or the ritually impure.

With regard to the Buddha, this area stretched by and large from Śrāvastī, the capital of Kosala, in the north-west to Rājagṛha, the capital of Magadha, in the south-east". According to Bronkhorst "there was indeed a culture of Greater Magadha which remained recognizably distinct from Vedic culture until the time of the grammarian Patañjali (ca. 150 BCE) and beyond". Vedic texts such as the Satapatha Brahmana demonize the inhabitants of this area as demonic and as speaking a barbarous speech. The Buddhologist Alexander Wynne writes that there is an "overwhelming amount of evidence" to suggest that this rival culture to the Vedic Aryans dominated the eastern Gangetic plain during the early Buddhist period. Orthodox Vedic Brahmins were, therefore, a minority in Magadha during this early period.

The Magadhan religions are termed the sramana traditions and include Jainism, Buddhism and Ājīvika. Buddhism and Jainism were the religions promoted by the early Magadhan kings, such as Srenika, Bimbisara and Ajatashatru, and the Nanda Dynasty (345–321 BCE) that followed was mostly Jain. These Sramana religions did not worship the Vedic deities, practised some form of asceticism and meditation (jhana) and tended to construct round burial mounds (called stupas in Buddhism). These religions also sought some type of liberation from the cyclic rounds of rebirth and karmic retribution through spiritual knowledge.

Religious sites in Magadha

Among the Buddhist sites currently found in the Magadha region include two UNESCO World Heritage Sites such as the Mahabodhi temple at Bodh Gaya and the Nalanda monastery. The Mahabodhi temple is one of the most important places of pilgrimage in the Buddhist world and is said to mark the site where the Buddha attained enlightenment.

Language

Beginning in the Theravada commentaries, the Pali language was the language of the kingdom of Magadha, and this was taken to also be the language that the Buddha used during his life. In the 19th century, the British Orientalist Robert Caesar Childers argued that the true or geographical name of the Pali language was Magadhi Prakrit, and that because pāḷi means "line, row, series", the early Buddhists extended the meaning of the term to mean "a series of books", so pāḷibhāsā means "language of the texts". Nonetheless, Pali does retain some eastern features that have been referred to as Māgadhisms.

Magadhi Prakrit was one of the three dramatic prakrits to emerge following the decline of Sanskrit. It was spoken in Magadha and neighbouring regions and later evolved into modern eastern Indo-Aryan languages like Magahi, Maithili and Bhojpuri.

Rulers 

Two notable rulers of Magadha were Bimbisara (also known as Shrenika) and his son Ajatashatru (also known as Kunika), who are mentioned in Buddhist and Jain literature as contemporaries of the Buddha and Mahavira. Later, the throne of Magadha was usurped by Mahapadma Nanda, the founder of the Nanda Dynasty (c. 345–322 BCE), which conquered much of north India. The Nanda dynasty was overthrown by Chandragupta Maurya, the founder of the Maurya Empire (c. 322–185 BCE).

There is much uncertainty about the succession of kings and the precise chronology of Magadha prior to Mahapadma Nanda; the accounts of various ancient texts (all of which were written many centuries later than the era in question) contradict each other on many points.
Furthermore, there is a "Long Chronology" and a contrasting "Short Chronology" preferred by some scholars, an issue that is inextricably linked to the uncertain chronology of the Buddha and Mahavira.

According to historian John Keay, a proponent of the "Short Chronology," Bimbisara must have been reigning in the late 5th century BCE, and Ajatashatru in the early 4th century BCE. Keay states that there is great uncertainty about the royal succession after Ajatashatru's death, probably because there was a period of "court intrigues and murders," during which "evidently the throne changed hands frequently, perhaps with more than one incumbent claiming to occupy it at the same time" until Mahapadma Nanda was able to secure the throne.

List of rulers 

The following "Long Chronology" is according to the Buddhist Mahavamsa:

Haryanka dynasty (c. 544 – 413 BCE)

Shishunaga dynasty (c. 413 – 345 BCE)

Nanda Empire (c. 345 – 322 BCE)

Other lists 

Puranic list
The Hindu Literature mostly Puranas give a different sequence:

Shishunaga dynasty (360 years)
 Shishunaga (reigned for 40 years)
 Kakavarna (36 years)
 Kshemadharman (20 years)
 Kshatraujas (29 years)
 Bimbisara (28 years)
 Ajatashatru (25 years)
 Darbhaka or Darshaka or Harshaka (25 years)
 Udayin (33 years)
 Nandivardhana (42 years)
 Mahanandin (43 years)
Nanda dynasty (100 years)

List by Jain literature
A shorter list appears in the Jain tradition, which simply lists Shrenika (Bimbisara), Kunika (Ajatashatru), Udayin, followed by the Nanda dynasty.

Historical figures from Magadha

Important people from the ancient region of Magadha include:

 Śāriputra – born to a wealthy Brahmin in a village located near Rājagaha in Magadha. He is considered the first of the Buddha's two chief male disciples, together with Maudgalyāyana.
 Maudgalyāyana – born in the village of Kolita in Magadha. He was one of the Buddha's two main disciples. In his youth, he was a spiritual wanderer before meeting the Buddha.
 Mahavira – the 24th Tirthankara of Jainism. Born into a royal kshatriya family in what is now Vaishali district of Bihar. He abandoned all worldly possessions at the age of 30 and became an ascetic. He is considered a slightly older contemporary of the Buddha.
 Maitripada – an 11th-century Indian Buddhist Mahasiddha associated with the Mahāmudrā transmission. Born in the village of Jhatakarani in Magadha. Also associated with the monasteries of Nalanda and Vikramashila.

See also
 Mahajanapadas
 History of India
 Magadha-Vajji war
 Magadha-Anga war
 Avanti-Magadhan Wars
 List of Indian monarchs
 Timeline of Indian history
 Magahi Culture
 Magahi Languages

References

Sources

 
 
 

 
Ancient India
Empires and kingdoms of India
History of Bihar
Iron Age cultures of South Asia
Mahajanapadas
Jain empires and kingdoms
Regions of Bihar
Kingdoms of Bihar
4th-century BC disestablishments in India
Magahi language
Ancient Indian cities
Empires and kingdoms of Nepal
Former kingdoms